Gamma Coronae Australis (γ CrA), is a binary star located in the constellation Corona Australis. The system has a combined apparent visual magnitude of 4.20, making it faintly visible to the naked eye. It is located 56.4 light-years (17.3 parsecs) from the Sun, based on its parallax. Gamma Coronae Australis is a member of the Milky Way's thin disk.

The system is a visual binary, where the orbit is calculated from observations of one star orbiting the other. The primary, Gamma Coronae Australis A, is a late F-type main-sequence star with an effective temperature of 6,090 K. It has an absolute an absolute magnitude of +3.73, and a mass of 1.15 solar masses. The secondary, Gamma Coronae Australis B, is also F-type. With an effective temperature of 6,100 K, an absolute magnitude of +3.80, and a mass of 1.14 solar masses, the companion is almost identical to the primary. Gamma Coronae Australis has been known to be a binary for a long time, and its two components have been given Henry Draper Catalogue designations of HD 177474 and HD 177475, respectively. The two stars are separated by 1.896 and orbit each other every 121.76 years.

References 

Corona Australis, Gamma
Binary stars
Corona Australis
Corona Australis, Gamma
Durchmusterung objects
177475
093825
7227